Murari Sharma (Hindi: मुरारी शर्मा), (1 January 1901 – 2 April 1982) was an Indian revolutionary who took part in the Kakori Conspiracy and absconded away. Police could not trace him out as Murari Sharma was his fake name. His actual name was Murari Lal Gupta. While speaking as a Chief Guest this fact was disclosed by his son Damodar Swarup 'Vidrohi' - a revolutionary poet of Shahjahanpur district in the "Ram Prasad Bismil Jayanti Sangoshthi" organised by Hindi Academy Delhi on 19 June 1997 at Rajendra Bhawan New Delhi. He was born on 1 January 1901 to Chhote Lal Gupta a khandsari (en. sugar producing business man) of village Mudia Panwar in Shahjahanpur district of Uttar Pradesh. For some times he lived underground in Delhi and later on returned to his native village. He died natural death on 2 April 1982 in his house of Shahjahanpur at the age of 81. He never sat on a Rikshaw throughout his life, for the reason that it was pulled in the city by a man, and being a man himself he considered it unethical to be pulled by a man.

See also
 Shahjahanpur District
 Ram Prasad Bismil
 Kakori Conspiracy
 Indian independence movement

References

Jagdish 'Jagesh' Kalam Aaj Unki Jai Bol 1989 Hindi Pracharak Sansthan P.B.1106 Pishach Mochan Varanasi 221001 U.P. India
Dr. Mahaur Bhagwan Das Kakori Shaheed Smriti 1978  2, Mehandi Building, Kaiser Bagh Lucknow 226001 U.P. India
 Vidyarnav Sharma Yug Ke Devta - Bismil Aur Ashfaq 2004 Praveen Prakashan New Delhi 110030 India 
 'Vidrohi' Damodar Swarup Deevar Ke Saaye Mein (Autobiography) 2005 Gandhi Pustakalay Chowk Shahjahanpur 242001 U.P. India
 Amar Shaheed Ko Naman ("Abhyuday" Special Issue Reprint) 2002 National Archives New Delhi

External links
 "Daredevilry of sons of the soil." The Times Of India.Mentions Sharma as "escaped" from capture.

Indian revolutionaries
People from Shahjahanpur
1901 births
1982 deaths
Hindustan Socialist Republican Association